Labbé Point is a point projecting  into the southwest part of Discovery Bay from Parvomay Neck, Greenwich Island in the South Shetland Islands, Antarctica with an adjacent ice-free area of .  The point forms the northwest side of the entrance to Basullo Cove and the east side of the entrance to Vinett Cove.  The small Basso Island is linked by a mainly submerged spit to the north side of Labbé Point.

The features were charted and named by the 1947 Chilean Antarctic Expedition after members of the expedition: Lieutenant Custodio Labbé, navigation officer of the transport ship Angamos; Vinett, the boatswain of the expedition; and Juan Basso, chief storekeeper on the frigate Iquique.

Location

Maps
 L.L. Ivanov et al. Antarctica: Livingston Island and Greenwich Island, South Shetland Islands. Scale 1:100000 topographic map. Sofia: Antarctic Place-names Commission of Bulgaria, 2005.

See also 
 Composite Antarctic Gazetteer
 List of Antarctic islands south of 60° S
 SCAR
 Territorial claims in Antarctica

References

External links
 SCAR Composite Antarctic Gazetteer.

Headlands of Greenwich Island